Alisa Alekseyevna Kozhikina (born 22 June 2003) is a Russian singer. In 2014, she became the first person to win The Voice Kids Russia. Later that year she represented Russia at the Junior Eurovision Song Contest 2014 in Malta with her song "Dreamer."

Early life
Alisa Kozhikina was born on 22 June 2003 in Uspenka, a rural village in Kursk Oblast. Alisa herself is no stranger to singing contests, thus having received a variety of awards. She has taken part in various contests, including the 2010 Rose of the Winds, the 2011 Constellation of Youth, and the 2012 New Wave Junior.

Musical career

2014: The Voice Kids Russia and 2014 Junior Eurovision Song Contest
In April 2014, Kozhikina won the grand final of TV singing contest The Voice Kids Russia on the Russian Channel One. In the superfinal (the last stage of the contest) she sang a Russian version of Mariah Carey's hit "My All" (with newly-written Russian lyrics by Maxim Fadeev, her coach on the show). The prize was 500 thousand roubles and a recording contract with Universal Music.

On 22 September 2014 it became known that Alisa Kozhikina was selected to represent Russia at the 12th annual Junior Eurovision Song Contest in Malta, with her song "Dreamer". The song was composed by Maxim Fadeev, the lyrics were written by Kozhikina herself along with Serebro's Olga Seryabkina. Alisa was the thirteenth to perform at the finals. She landed at the fifth place in the contest with 96 points.

Also in 2014 Alisa performed as a special guest at the Russian  (in June) and voiced all the vocal parts of the main heroine for the Russian-language version of the 2014 U.S. musical film Annie, which was released in Russian cinemas on 19 March 2015.

2015–2016: Recording debut
In April 2015 Alisa Kozhikina released her debut single, which was a cover of the song "Get Lucky" by Daft Punk. The singles "Little Red Riding Hood" and "I'm Lying on the Beach" followed by the end of August.

In the autumn of 2015 Alisa's song "Stala Silnee" ("I Became Stronger") received airplay on dozens of radio stations in Russia and Russian-language radio stations across the world. It peaked at 53rd position in the Top Hit Weekly General chart and at 74th position in the Top Hit Weekly Russia chart.

In 2016 she lent her singing voice to the soundtrack of the Russian version of the children's animated series Princess Sissi which had been shown on the Russian TV channel Gulli since December 2015.

Before that, in 2015, Alisa together with Semyon Treskunov recorded the main theme song for the Russian animation feature film . (The song plays during the ending credits.) She also played the title role of Alice (in Russian, the name is "Alisa") in the illusionists  New Year's show Alice in Wonderland. During the New Year holidays it was attended by over 12,000 people.

On 13 May 2016 in Belgorod Alisa Kozhikina gave her first ever solo concert.

On 1 November 2016 Alisa Kozhikina released her first ever album, titled I Am Not a Toy. The music video for the title track, which was uploaded to YouTube on 31 October, gathered its first 1 million views there in less than 48 hours.

Discography

Albums

Singles and selected songs

 * The Top Hit Weekly General chart's rankings are based on airplay on 230 radio stations in Russia, as well as 200 Russian-language radio stations all over the world (in Ukraine, the CIS countries, the Baltic states, Cyprus, Israel, Germany, the United States, and Canada).
 [A] Russia's Junior Eurovision Song Contest 2014 entry
 [B] Alisa Kozhikina's debut single
 [C]  From the soundtrack for the Russian animated feature film 
 [D]  The Russian-language title song for the French animated television series Princess Sissi

References

External links

 

2003 births
Living people
People from Kursk Oblast
Russian pop singers
Russian child singers
Junior Eurovision Song Contest entrants for Russia
The Voice Kids contestants
21st-century Russian women singers
21st-century Russian singers